PPPD is the Point-to-Point Protocol daemon which is used to 
manage network connections between two nodes on Unix-like operating systems. It is configured using command-line arguments and configuration files.

While it has initially been used to manage only dial-up access, it is also used to manage broadband connections such as DSL, if Point-to-Point Protocol over Ethernet (PPPoE) or Point-to-Point Protocol over ATM (PPPoA) is used.

The role of pppd is managing PPP session establishment and session termination. 
During session establishment, pppd has the role of:
 Looped link detection: PPP detects looped links using magic numbers. When PPPD sends PPP LCP messages, these messages include a magic number. If a line is looped, the node receives an LCP message with its own magic number, instead of getting a message with the peer's magic number.
Automatic self configuration: Using Link Control Protocol it has to negotiate protocol features like Address-and-Control-Field-Compression (ACFC), escaped characters, and the compression, encryption (like MPPE) and authentication methods to use.
Access control and authentication: Using protocols like Challenge-handshake authentication protocol (CHAP) or Password authentication protocol (PAP) it has to provide and check authentication data.
Layer 3 configuration: If using Internet Protocol Control Protocol (IPCP), it will negotiate or determine IP parameters such as the IP addresses, the maximum transmission unit, and name server addresses. Some versions may also support Internetwork Packet Exchange Control Protocol (IPXCP) and AppleTalk Control Protocol (ATCP) for routing IPX or AppleTalk over the link.
After negotiation is complete, it has to set up the required network interfaces and routes, so that the connection is run by the kernel.

pppd terminates a PPP link when:
 too many frames with invalid frame check sequence (FCS) field have been received
 the link is considered "idle" (if configured)
 another program or the peer requests link termination.

Some newer versions of pppd are also capable of handling Dial-on-demand routing, where pppd sets up a virtual network, captures the packages it receives and establishes a PPP connection and forwards the captured and not-yet transmitted packages over the link.

Frontends and configurators
 kppp – A kde GUI frontend for pppd.
 gnome-ppp – A gnome GUI frontend for pppd.
 pppconfig – It uses the standard ppp configuration files and sets ppp up so that the standard pon and poff commands (to connect and disconnect) and plog (to list the log) can be used to control ppp. It includes modem detection.
 wvdial – A CLI tool which is used for modem initialisation before starting pppd.

References

 Manual page: pppd(8) (man pppd in a Unix terminal or pppd man page at ppp.samba.org).

Further reading
 Linux PPP HOWTO
 FAQ about ppp configuration
 Use of pon, poff and plog
 Understanding debug ppp negotiation Output
 pppd(8): Point-to-Point Protocol Daemon

External links
 Linux-ppp mailing list
 RP-PPPoE, a PPPoE client, server and relay implementation for Linux.
 ACCEL-PPP, high performance PPTP/L2TP/PPPoE/IPoE server for Linux.
 
 Apple ppp source

Free network-related software
Unix network-related software